Berlin Township is a township in Steele County, Minnesota, United States. The population was 508 at the  census.

Berlin Township was organized in 1857, and named after Berlin, Wisconsin.

Geography

Demographics
The population density was 14.5 people per square mile (5.6/km2). There were 268 housing units at an average density of 7.6/sq mi (2.9/km2). The racial makeup of the township was 99.41% White, 0.20% Asian, and 0.39% from two or more races. Hispanic or Latino of any race were 1.38% of the population.

There were 189 households, out of which 31.2% had children under the age of 18 living with them, 70.9% were married couples living together, 2.6% had a female householder with no husband present, and 20.6% were non-families. 18.0% of all households were made up of individuals, and 7.9% had someone living alone who was 65 years of age or older.  The average household size was 2.69 and the average family size was 3.05.

In the township the population was spread out, with 26.2% under the age of 18, 5.9% from 18 to 24, 28.5% from 25 to 44, 26.6% from 45 to 64, and 12.8% who were 65 years of age or older.  The median age was 40 years. For every 100 females, there were 119.9 males.  For every 100 females age 18 and over, there were 115.5 males.

The median income for a household in the township was $47,083, and the median income for a family was $55,000. Males had a median income of $32,500 versus $25,714 for females. The per capita income for the township was $18,764.  About 6.3% of families and 10.7% of the population were below the poverty line, including 12.3% of those under age 18 and 7.5% of those age 65 or over.

References

Townships in Steele County, Minnesota
Townships in Minnesota
1857 establishments in Minnesota Territory
Populated places established in 1857